Tu is a British mass market fashion label founded by Adams for Sainsbury's. It is the United Kingdom's third largest online clothing retailer and the United Kingdom's sixth largest clothing retailer by volume.

History
The Tu brand was founded in 2004 by Adams for Sainsbury's, as a replacement for the Jeff & Co range designed by Jeff Banks. It was initially launched in 160 stores. The original range included both clothing under the "TU" brand and homewares under the brand "TU Home".

In 2011, Sainsbury's entered into a partnership with the television clothing guru Gok Wan to design a new clothing range.

In 2013, Sainsbury's relaunched the Tu brand, concentrating it entirely on clothing, with the homewares re-branded under the core "by Sainsbury's" brand (the Sainsbury's homewares range is now branded as Habitat as of 2021). The logo was also changed, from all uppercase letters to a capital "T" and a lowercase "u", to emphasise that the brand is pronounced like "two" and not "tea you".

In 2015, Sainsbury's set up a dedicated website, tuclothing.sainsburys.co.uk (branded as Tu.co.uk), to sell the product range nationwide to a much bigger audience.

Following Sainsbury's acquisition of Argos in 2016, Sainsbury's started selling Tu clothing on the Argos website in 2018. This brought a much larger demographic of shoppers to the Tu brand, enabling access to a much broader range of household incomes.

Product range
Tu sells a wide range of clothing for men, women and children, with 3,000 lines sold through 400 Sainsbury's supermarkets.

See also
Sainsbury's

References

External links

 

Clothing brands of the United Kingdom
Clothing retailers of the United Kingdom
British brands
2004 establishments in the United Kingdom
Sainsbury's